The 2015 Kerry Senior Hurling Championship was the 114th staging of the Kerry Senior Hurling Championship since its establishment by the Kerry County Board in 1889. The championship began on 17 July 2015 and ended on 27 September 2015.

The championship was won by Kilmoyley who secured the title following a 3-15 to 1-13 defeat of St Brendan's, Ardfert in the final. This was their 23rd championship title and their first in six championship seasons.

Lixnaw were the defending champions, however, they were defeated at the semi-final stage.

Results

Round 1

Round 2A

Round 2B

Quarter-finals

Semi-finals

Final

Championship statistics

Miscellaneous
 Kilmoyley win the title for the first time in seven seasons.
 The final is played in Abbeydorney Sportsfield due to refurbishment of Austin Stack Park.

External links

 2015 Kerry Senior Hurling Championship

References

Kerry Senior Hurling Championship
Kerry Senior Hurling Championship